Thandolwethu Mnyaka (born 15 January 1993) is a South African cricketer who plays for the Border. He was the leading wicket-taker in the 2017–18 Sunfoil 3-Day Cup for Northern Cape, with 20 dismissals in eight matches.

In September 2018, Mnyaka was named in Free State's squad for the 2018 Africa T20 Cup. He was the leading wicket-taker for Free State in the 2018–19 CSA 3-Day Provincial Cup, with 21 dismissals in seven matches. In September 2019, he was named in Free State's squad for the 2019–20 CSA Provincial T20 Cup.

References

External links
 

1993 births
Living people
South African cricketers
Border cricketers
Free State cricketers
Warriors cricketers
Griqualand West cricketers
Northern Cape cricketers
Place of birth missing (living people)